Crypsina is a genus of flies in the family Tachinidae.

Species
C. prima Brauer & von Bergenstamm, 1889

References

Exoristinae
Diptera of Asia
Tachinidae genera
Taxa named by Friedrich Moritz Brauer
Taxa named by Julius von Bergenstamm